Expedition 33 was the 33rd long-duration expedition to the International Space Station (ISS). It began on 16 September 2012 with the departure from the ISS of the Soyuz TMA-04M spacecraft, which returned the Expedition 32 crew to Earth.

Crew

Source NASA

Notable experiments

The crew successfully experimented with the Delay-tolerant networking protocol and managed to control a Lego robot on earth from space.

References

External links

NASA's Space Station Expeditions page
NASA's Consolidated Launch Schedule

Expeditions to the International Space Station
2012 in spaceflight